Bruno Touschek (3 February 1921 – 25 May 1978) was an Austrian physicist, a survivor of the Holocaust, and initiator of research on electron-positron colliders.

Biography
Touschek was born and attended school in Vienna. In 1937, he was not allowed to finish high school since his mother was Jewish. He passed the final year exam in a different school as an external pupil. Shortly after he started studying physics and mathematics at the University in Vienna, he again had to quit for racial reasons. Thanks to a couple of friends, he could keep on studying in Hamburg, where nobody knew of his origins. In order to make a living, he took up several jobs at the same time.

During this period, he worked at the Studiengesellschaft für Elektronengeräte, a company affiliated to Philips, where "drift tubes" - the forerunners of the klystron - were being developed at that time. In 1943, he asked Rolf Widerøe to cooperate with him in building a betatron, critically studying an article of Donald Kerst. In the following, Touschek, Widerøe, R. Kollath and G. Schumann worked on a 15 MeV betatron, which was constructed near Hamburg and was operational in 1944. When Touschek was arrested by the Gestapo in 1945, Widerøe visited him in prison, and during these meetings they continued to talk about the betatron. In particular, Touschek conceived the idea of radiation damping for electrons circulating in a betatron.

Largely by chance, Touschek escaped the Kiel concentration camp to which he would have been deported. During the death march from the Hamburg prison, Touschek was shot by an SS officer, presumed being dead, and thus left behind. After the war, he graduated from the University of Göttingen in 1946, where he came into contact with Werner Heisenberg and Carl Friedrich von Weizsäcker, and finished his diploma thesis.

A short time later, he was appointed at Max Planck Institute as a research worker. In 1947, he left for Glasgow on a fellowship. He was subsequently appointed an Official lecturer in Natural Philosophy at the University of Glasgow, a position he kept until he left for Rome in 1952. He decided to stay in Rome permanently, receiving the position of researcher at the National laboratories of the Istituto Nazionale di Fisica Nucleare in Frascati, near Rome. He was also appointed as a part-time lecturer at the University of Rome-La Sapienza, where he eventually became a full professor in 1978. He did, however, return to Glasgow briefly in 1955 where he married artist Elspeth Yonge (born 1931), the daughter of the eminent Scottish zoologist Charles Maurice Yonge. A son, Francis, was born in 1958 and brother Steven followed in 1961.

On 7 March 1960, Touschek gave a talk in Frascati where he proposed the idea of a collider: a particle accelerator where a particle and its antiparticle circulate the same orbit in opposite direction. When bunches of opposite-moving particles and antiparticles collide, they annihilate and produce new particles depending on the collision energy. This concept is at the base of all present-day very high energy particle accelerators, such as the Large Hadron Collider (LHC) at CERN. The first electron-positron storage ring, called Anello Di Accumulazione (ADA), was constructed in Frascati under Touschek's supervision in the early sixties. During the next decade more electron-positron rings followed and their outcomes changed completely some of the physics community perceptions of the world. One of the transitions, the elementary hadrons by then turned to be composite particles after.
Even though ADA has been turned off long time ago, the laboratory is active and contributes work in the field of electron linear accelerators. Significant collaborations are the LIL for LEP in 1986 and CLIC test facility at CERN.

Touschek died in Innsbruck in 1978.

See also 
 Touschek effect
 Betatron
 List of famous Holocaust survivors

References

 

1921 births
1978 deaths
Accelerator physicists
Austrian Jews
Austrian physicists
People associated with CERN
Holocaust survivors
Scientists from Vienna
Recipients of the Matteucci Medal